Dingbats is a Unicode block containing dingbats (or typographical ornaments, like the ❦ FLORAL HEART character). Most of its characters were taken from Zapf Dingbats; it was the Unicode block to have imported characters from a specific typeface; Unicode later adopted a policy that excluded symbols with "no demonstrated need or strong desire to exchange in plain text," and thus no further dingbat typefaces were encoded until Webdings and Wingdings were encoded in Version 7.0. Some ornaments are also an emoji, having optional presentation variants (called variant selectors).

The block, originally named "Zapf Dingbats", was added to the Unicode Standard in October 1991, with the release of version 1.0. The block name was changed from "Zapf Dingbats" to "Dingbats" in June 1993, with the release of 1.1.

Chart

Emoji 
The Dingbats block contains 33 emoji. 40 standardized variants are defined to specify emoji-style (like ) or text presentation (like ) for twenty base characters.

Emoji modifiers 

The Dingbats block has four emoji that represent hands.
They can be modified using U+1F3FB–U+1F3FF to provide for a range of human skin color using the Fitzpatrick scale:

Additional human emoji can be found in other Unicode blocks: Emoticons, Miscellaneous Symbols, Miscellaneous Symbols and Pictographs, Supplemental Symbols and Pictographs, Symbols and Pictographs Extended-A and Transport and Map Symbols.

History 
The following Unicode-related documents record the purpose and process of defining specific characters in the Dingbats block:

See also
 Ornamental Dingbats, another Unicode block

References

Unicode blocks